Peripeteia  (alternative Latin form: Peripetīa, ultimately from ) is a reversal of circumstances, or turning point. The term is primarily used with reference to works of literature; its anglicized form is peripety.

Aristotle's view
Aristotle, in his Poetics, defines peripeteia as "a change by which the action veers round to its opposite, subject always to our rule of probability or necessity." According to Aristotle, peripeteia, along with discovery, is the most effective when it comes to drama, particularly in a tragedy. He wrote that "The finest form of Discovery is one attended by Peripeteia, like that which goes with the Discovery in Oedipus...".

Aristotle says that peripeteia is the most powerful part of a plot in a tragedy along with discovery. A peripety is the change of the kind described from one state of things within the play to its opposite, and that too in the way we are saying, in the probable or necessary sequence of events. There is often no element like Peripeteia; it can bring forth or result in terror, mercy, or in comedies it can bring a smile or it can bring forth tears (Rizo). 

This is the best way to spark and maintain attention throughout the various form and genres of drama "Tragedy imitates good actions and, thereby, measures and depicts the well-being of its protagonist. But in his formal definition, as well as throughout the Poetics, Aristotle emphasizes that" ... Tragedy is an imitation not only of a complete action, but also of events inspiring fear or pity" (1452a 1); in fact, at one point Aristotle isolates the imitation of "actions that excite pity and fear" as "the distinctive mark of tragic imitation" (1452b 30). 

Pity and fear are effected through reversal and recognition; and these "most powerful elements of emotional interest in Tragedy-Peripeteia or Reversal of the Situation, and recognition scenes-are parts of the plot (1450a 32). has the shift of the tragic protagonist's fortune from good to bad, which is essential to the plot of a tragedy. It is often an ironic twist. Good uses of Peripeteia are those that especially are parts of a complex plot, so that they are defined by their changes of fortune being accompanied by reversal, recognition, or both" (Smithson).

Peripeteia includes changes of character, but also more external changes.  A character who becomes rich and famous from poverty and obscurity has undergone peripeteia, even if his character remains the same.

When a character learns something he had been previously ignorant of, this is normally distinguished from peripeteia as anagnorisis or discovery, a distinction derived from Aristotle's work.

Aristotle considers anagnorisis, leading to peripeteia, the mark of a superior tragedy. Two such plays are Oedipus Rex, where the oracle's information that Oedipus had killed his father and married his mother brought about his mother's death and his own blindness and exile, and Iphigenia in Tauris, where Iphigenia realizes that the strangers she is to sacrifice are her brother and his friend, resulting in all three of them escaping Tauris. These plots he considered complex and superior to simple plots without anagnorisis or peripeteia, such as when Medea resolves to kill her children, knows they are her children, and does so. Aristotle identified Oedipus Rex as the principal work demonstrating peripety. (See Aristotle's Poetics.)

Examples

Oedipus Rex
In Sophocles' Oedipus Rex, the peripeteia occurs towards the end of the play when the Messenger brings Oedipus news of his parentage.  In the play, Oedipus is fated to murder his father and marry his mother.  His parents, Laius and Jocasta, try to forestall the oracle by sending their son away to be killed, but he is actually raised by Polybus and his wife, Merope, the rulers of another kingdom.  The irony of the Messenger’s information is that it was supposed to comfort Oedipus and assure him that he was the son of Polybus. Unfortunately for Oedipus, the Messenger says, "Polybus was nothing to you, [Oedipus] that’s why, not in blood" (Sophocles 1113).  

The Messenger received Oedipus from one of Laius’ servants and then gave him to Polybus.  The plot comes together when Oedipus realizes that he is the son and murderer of Laius as well as the son and husband of Jocasta.  Martin M. Winkler says that here, peripeteia and anagnôrisis occur at the same time "for the greatest possible impact" because Oedipus has been "struck a blow from above, as if by fate or the gods. He is changing from the mighty and somewhat arrogant king of Thebes to a figure of woe" (Winkler 57).

Conversion of Paul on the road to Damascus

The instantaneous conversion of Paul on the road to Damascus is a classic example of peripeteia, which Eusebius presented in his Life of Constantine as a pattern for the equally revelatory conversion of Constantine. Modern biographers of Constantine see his conversion less as a momentary phenomenon than as a step in a lifelong process.

The Three Apples
In "The Three Apples", a medieval Arabian Nights, after the murderer reveals himself near the middle of the story, he explains his reasons behind the murder in a flashback, which begins with him going on a journey to find three rare apples for his wife, but after returning finds out she cannot eat them due to her lingering illness. Later at work, he sees a slave passing by with one of those apples claiming that he received it from his girlfriend, a married woman with three such apples her husband gave her. He returns home and demands his wife to show him all three apples, but she only shows him two. This convinces him of her infidelity and he murders her as a result. After he disposes of her body, he returns home, where his son confesses that he had stolen one of the apples and that a slave, to whom he had told about his father's journey, had fled with it. The murderer thus realizes his guilt and regrets what he has just done.

The second use of peripety occurs near the end. After finding out about the culprit behind the murder, the protagonist Ja'far ibn Yahya is ordered by Harun al-Rashid to find the tricky slave within three days, or else he will have Ja'far executed instead. After the deadline has passed, Ja'far prepares to be executed for his failure and bids his family farewell. As he hugs his youngest daughter, he feels a round object in her pocket, which is revealed to be the same apple that the culprit was holding. In the story's twist ending, the daughter reveals that she obtained it from their slave, Rayhan. Ja'far thus realizes that his own slave was the culprit all along. He then finds Rayhan and solves the case, preventing his own execution. That was a plot twist.

See also
 Deus ex machina

Notes

Further reading
Aristotle, Poetics, trans. Ingram Bywater; Modern Library College Editions, New York, 1984.
Finlayson, James G., "Conflict and Reconciliation in Hegel's Theory of the Tragic", Journal of the History of Philosophy 37 (1999); pp. 493–520.
Lucas, F. L., "The Reverse of Aristotle" (an essay on peripeteia), Classical Review, Vol. XXXVII Nos 5,6; Aug.–Sept. 1923; pp. 98–104.
Rizo, Juan Pablo Mártir, Poetica de Aristoteles traducida de Latin; M. Newels Elias L. Rivers MLN, Vol. 82, No. 5, General Issue. (Dec., 1967), pp. 642–643
Silk, M. S., Tragedy and the Tragic: Greek Theatre and Beyond; Oxford, 1998; pp. 377–380.
Smithson, Isaiah, Journal of the History of Ideas, Vol. 44, No. 1. (Jan. - Mar., 1983), pp. 3–17.
Sophocles, Oedipus the King, in The Three Theban Plays, trans. Robert Fagles; Comp. Bernard Knox; New York: Penguin, 1982.
Winkler, Martin M., Oedipus in the Cinema, Arethusa, 2008; pp. 67–94.

External links
Britannica Online Encyclopedia
F. L. Lucas, "The Reverse of Aristotle": a discussion of Peripeteia (Classical Review, August–September 1922)
Clifford Leech, Tragedy

Ancient Greek theatre
Literary concepts
Narratology
Plot (narrative)
Poetics
Greek words and phrases